The Sydney Sixers are an Australian professional franchise men's cricket team, competing in Australia's domestic Twenty20 cricket competition, the Big Bash League (BBL). Along with the Sydney Thunder, the Sixers are the successors of the New South Wales Blues who played in the now-defunct KFC Twenty20 Big Bash. The Sixers play at Sydney Cricket Ground in the south-eastern area of the inner city while the Thunder play out of Sydney Showground Stadium further west. The inaugural coach was Trevor Bayliss, who was replaced in 2015 by current coach Greg Shipperd. The Sixers' inaugural captain was Australian wicket-keeper Brad Haddin. Both Steve Smith and Moises Henriques have also spent time captaining the team.

Competing in the inaugural Big Bash League, the Sydney Sixers went on to win the tournament. After finishing third in the regular season games, the Sixers defeated the Hobart Hurricanes in the semi-final at Bellerive Oval. This facilitated a show-down with the Perth Scorchers in the final. They defeated the Scorchers on 28 January 2012, at the WACA Ground, thus becoming the inaugural champions of the Big Bash League. Their second championship came in the ninth BBL season in 2019–20, and was followed by another title in the 2020–2021 season, making the Sixers the current BBL Champions and the equal most successful BBL franchise, tied for three championships with the Perth Scorchers.

As a result of their successful Big Bash League grand final win in BBL01, the Sixers competed for the first time in the Champions League Twenty20 tournament. The tournament was held in October 2012 in South Africa. Again, the Sixers made history by winning this tournament on their first attempt. The Sixers were top of their group going into the finals of the tournament. They went on to defeat the Nashua Titans in the semi-finals and then the Highveld Lions in the final of the tournament to be crowned champions.

History

Foundation 
The Sydney Sixers were created when the decision was made to move away from state representative teams to city-based teams for the domestic Twenty20 competition. It is believed that this move was to align its structure with that of India and South Africa, where their domestic teams are based around cities. This was an important factor for the ongoing Champions League Twenty20 tournament, where those three nations were founding members. It was decided that there would be two teams from Sydney, two teams from Melbourne, and one from each other capital city for an eight team competition. The names Sixers (and Thunder for cross-city rivals) were decided upon by Cricket NSW. Other names considered for the two teams were Rocks and Edge.

2011–2012: BBL01

Regular season 

The Sydney Sixers were chosen to host the first game of the new and exciting format of the BBL. The game was played on December 16, 2011, at the historical Sydney Cricket Ground (SCG) against the Brisbane Heat. The Sixers then traveled down to Hobart and were dominated by the Hurricanes in a 42-run defeat. Phil Jaques and Travis Birt amassing a 107 wicket partnership, with Birt the Player of the Match. Upon returning home, a standout performance with the bat from West Indian import Dwayne Bravo assured the win for the Sixers with 51 runs as the Melbourne Stars fell 2 runs short in an exciting run chase. The Sixers then lost on the road to the Melbourne Renegades before picking up away wins against Sydney Thunder and Adelaide Strikers. The Sixers then battled-out a hard-fought win against the Perth Scorchers at home. After losing a couple of early wickets, Steve Smith smacked a quickfire 51 before the Sixers lost 5/8 in the final two overs to be bowled out for 176. In the end this was enough as the Scorchers failed to achieve the target by one run. The stunning spell of swing by Mitchell Starc earned him the Player of the Match.

Finals Series 
In-form after three consecutive wins to close out the regular season, the Sixers went on to win against the Hurricanes in Hobart. Sydney were able to put on a par-score after winning the toss (6/153, Nic Maddinson – 68 runs). A good spell of bowling from Brett Lee (2/22) and Ian Moran at the death ensured the Sixers would reach the final. The Sixers went on to win the inaugural 2011–12 Big Bash League (BBL), defeating the Perth Scorchers at the WACA Ground. Again Lee (2/21) lead the Sixers attack as they were able to restrict Perth to 8/156. Moises Henriques guided the innings, scoring 70 runs to make light work of the run-chase. The Sixers winning with 7 balls to spare.

2012–2013: BBL02

2012 Champions League Twenty20 
By winning the inaugural 2011–12 Big Bash League, the Sixers earned the right to compete in the 2012 Champions League Twenty20 tournament. The Sixers were drawn into Group B along with the Chennai Super Kings, Mumbai Indians (India – Indian Premier League), Yorkshire (England – Twenty20 Cup) and Highveld Lions. The Sixers cruised through the Group Stage without too many difficulties. The batters blasted the Super Kings out of the park scoring 185/5 with the bowlers backing them up to win by 12 runs. Mitchell Starc tore through Yorkshire (96/9) to which the Sixers surpassed in 8.5 overs. The Sixers were able to overcome the Lions humble score (137/9) with and over to spare before making it four-from-four with an easy 12-run win over the Indians.

Their semi-final match against the Titans proved much more challenging. The Titans amassed a modest 163/5 with the Sixers needing all twenty to overs to secure the win. On the final delivery, Pat Cummins missed the ball entirely but the batters were able to scramble home for a bye despite Cummins colliding with the bowler. The final however, was in stark contrast. The Sixers attack, led by Josh Hazlewood bundled out the Highveld Lions for a poultry 121 runs. They only needed 12.3 to blast home the runs with Michael Lumb thumping an unbeaten 82 runs.

Regular season 
The Sixers season ended in bitter disappointment, winning only two games and coming second last on the ladder. They did not qualify for the finals series.

2013–2014: BBL03 

In what was effectively a very good regular season (only losing one of eight games) and coming second on the ladder the Sixers were left to rue what might have been as they were once again beaten by the Perth Scorchers in the semi-finals. In a rain-effected match, the Sixers target was reduced to 54 in 5 overs and the seemingly impossible target was realised when they fell short at 6/48.

2014–2015: BBL04 

The Sixers put their BBL03 campaign behind them, signing some new faces whilst retaining the more experienced core group of players. The Sixers looked very good throughout the entire regular season winning five games, losing two games (to Perth Scorchers and Adelaide Strikers) in regular time and losing an absolutely enthralling Super Over to the Melbourne Stars.

Coming up against the Strikers in Adelaide (to whom they had already lost to in the season) they were able to get the job done easily in the end. Some big hitting (Nic Maddinson – 85 runs) set up a 4/181 scoreline before the bowlers were able to rip through the Strikers batting order, all-out for 94 runs. With a very poor record against the Perth Scorchers (aside from the BBL01 Big Final victory), the Sixers opened proceedings at Manuka Oval in Canberra for the 4th edition of the "Big Final". Some early wickets made it hard going for the Sixers with skipper Moises Henriques scoring a well-made 77 (before being run-out on the final delivery). The Scorchers steadily continued to pile on the runs with wickets in hand. Needing 8 runs off the final over, Brett Lee put in arguably his best Twenty20 performance in his final game of professional cricket. His first ball was expertly paddled for runs before Lee began to sting the opposition. With three balls remaining the Scorchers were destined to win with one needed. However, Lee wouldn't go away taking back-to-back wickets. Still requiring one more run, with Lee on a hat-trick, Yasir Arafat was able to flick the ball off his pads and the batsmen were able to scamper through for a single after the throw to the bowler's end was too hard for Henriques to catch and effect the run-out which would have brought the game to a Super Over.

2016–2017: BBL06 

The Sixers finished third on the BBL ladder after eight regular season games.

In the Semi Final at the Gabba against the Brisbane Heat, captain Moises Henriques was the Player of the Match after the Sixers defeated the Heat in a Super Over.

The Sixers travelled to Perth for the Big Final after the first-placed Scorchers defeated the Melbourne Stars in their Semi Final. However, the Sydney Sixers fell short at the last hurdle, losing the Big Bash League final to the Scorchers by nine wickets at the WACA Ground.

It was the second time in three years the Sixers made the final against the Scorchers but couldn't grasp the title.

Colours 
The Sixers play in a magenta strip. While a spokesperson from Cricket NSW alluded that the team's colours may have some connection with the "Pink dollar" and Sydney Gay and Lesbian Mardi Gras, pink was ultimately chosen for reasons more related to McGrath Foundation, and to create a "really rock star, high-profile cricket team".
Orange and yellow had also been considered for the Sixers and cross-town rivals, Sydney Thunder, but Cricket NSW believed these colours were too similar to that of the Western Australian cricket team, the Wests Tigers (NRL) and the GWS Giants (AFL). Magenta, therefore, gave a unique identity for the team and attempted to create a reflection of the competition which was "new and vibrant."

Home ground 

The Sydney Sixers play out of the Sydney Cricket Ground, Sydney. The stadium has had a capacity of 48,000 since the completion of redevelopments in 2014. A part of the makeover included new state-of-art facilities and grandstand as well as one of the biggest video screens in the southern hemisphere.

The Sixers set a new domestic crowd record for cricket in New South Wales when 39,756 people attended the Sydney Smash on January 14, 2017.

Rivalries 

 The Sydney Smash – When the league began in 2011, Cricket Australia decided they would place two teams in Sydney. With the core group of players for both sides coming from the New South Wales cricket team, this rivalry automatically becomes widely anticipated in Sydney. After four seasons of the BBL the Sydney Sixers finally lost to the Sydney Thunder in the opening match of the fifth series, breaking the seven consecutive wins the Sixers had banked up from previous years. Thunder also swept the 2015/16 season series 2–0. Matches played in subsequent seasons up to 2020 have seen one win by each team per season.

List of Sydney Smash Matches 

 with Perth Scorchers – Both teams have been competitive through the years with the Scorchers generally having the edge over the Sixers in some tight finishes. In BBL01 the Sixers gained bragging rights by securing the title in Perth. The Scorchers were able to enact revenge in BBL04 winning The Championship on the final ball. In BBL03 Perth recorded a fantastic win at the SCG in a Super Over when scores were level at the completion of 20 overs for each side. In 7 games, Sydney has won twice, Perth has won 4 times and there has been 1 tie (+ Perth win).

Players

Current squad 
The current squad of the Sydney Sixers for the 2022–23 Big Bash League season as of 6 December 2022.

 Players with international caps are listed in bold.

Captains

Year by year history

Records

Team Records

Result summary v. Opponent

Highest totals

Lowest Totals

Batting records

Most runs

High scores

Highest Averages 
Minimum 10 innings

Highest strike rates 
Minimum 100 balls faced

Most Fifties

Most Sixes

Bowling Records

Most Wickets

Best Bowling Figures

Partnerships

Highest partnerships by wicket

Honours

Domestic 
Big Bash:
Champions (3): 2011–12, 2019–20, 2020–21
Runners-Up (3): 2013–14, 2016–17, 2021–22
Minor Premiers (1): 2020–21
Finals Series Appearances (8): 2011–12, 2013–14, 2014–15, 2016–17, 2018–19, 2019–20, 2020–21, 2021–22
Wooden Spoons (1): 2015–16

International 
 Champions League Twenty20:
Champions (1): 2012
Appearances (1): 2012

Imported Players 
Dwayne Bravo – West Indies (2011)
Michael Lumb – England (2011–2015)
Jeevan Mendis – Sri Lanka (2012)
Sunil Narine – West Indies (2012)
Nathan McCullum – New Zealand (2012)
Ravi Bopara – England (2013)
Chris Tremlett – England (2013)
Sachithra Senanayake – Sri Lanka (2013)
Dwayne Smith – West Indies (2014)
Riki Wessels – England (2014–2015)
Johan Botha – South Africa (2015)
Sam Billings – England (2016–2018)
Jason Roy – England (2016–2018)
Colin Munro – New Zealand (2017)
Carlos Brathwaite – West Indies (2018, 2020–2021)
Joe Denly – England (2018–2019)
Tom Curran – England (2018–2021)
James Vince – England (2019–2022)
Jason Holder – West Indies (2020)
Jake Ball – England (2021)
 Chris Jordan – England (2021–2022)
 Izharulhaq Naveed (2022)

See also 

Cricket in New South Wales
Cricket NSW
New South Wales Blues
Sydney Thunder

References

External links 
 

Big Bash League teams
Cricket in New South Wales
Sports teams in Sydney
Cricket clubs established in 2011